Handy Park (also known as Handy-Nechocokee Park or Ne-cha-co-kee/Handy Park) is a public park in Fairview, Oregon, United States. The park houses the Fairview City Jail.

References

Parks in Multnomah County, Oregon